Little Aughwick Creek is a  tributary of Aughwick Creek in Fulton and Huntingdon counties, Pennsylvania in the United States.

Little Aughwick Creek joins with Sideling Hill Creek near the community of Maddensville to form Aughwick Creek.

Via Aughwick Creek and the Juniata River, it is a tributary of the Susquehanna River, flowing to Chesapeake Bay and the Atlantic Ocean.

See also
List of rivers of Pennsylvania

References

Rivers of Pennsylvania
Tributaries of the Juniata River
Rivers of Fulton County, Pennsylvania
Rivers of Huntingdon County, Pennsylvania